The 2018 Stratosphere 200 was the third stock car race of the 2018 NASCAR Camping World Truck Series season, and the 22nd iteration of the event. The race was held on Friday, March 2 in North Las Vegas, Nevada at Las Vegas Motor Speedway, a  permanent D-shaped oval racetrack. The race took the scheduled 134 laps to complete. In a late race restart, Kyle Busch of Kyle Busch Motorsports was able to hold off a charging Sauter and Moffitt for the last 11 laps to win the race, the 50th NASCAR Camping World Truck Series win of his career and the first of the season. To fill out the rest of the podium, Johnny Sauter of GMS Racing and Brett Moffitt of Hattori Racing Enterprises finished 2nd and 3rd, respectively.

Background 

Las Vegas Motor Speedway, located in Clark County, Nevada outside the Las Vegas city limits and about 15 miles northeast of the Las Vegas Strip, is a 1,200-acre (490 ha) complex of multiple tracks for motorsports racing. The complex is owned by Speedway Motorsports, Inc., which is headquartered in Charlotte, North Carolina.

Entry list

Practice

First practice 
The first practice was held on Thursday, March 1 at 5:05 PM EST.

Second and final practice 
The second and final practice was held on Thursday, March 1 at 7:05 PM EST.

Qualifying 
Qualifying was held on Friday, March 2, at 6:05 PM EST. The qualifying system was a single car, single lap, two round system where in the first round, everyone would set a time to determine positions 13-32. Then, the fastest 12 qualifiers would move on to the second round to determine positions 1-12.

Starting lineup

Race results 
Stage 1 Laps: 40

Stage 2 Laps: 40

Stage 3 Laps: 54

References 

2018 NASCAR Camping World Truck Series
NASCAR races at Las Vegas Motor Speedway
March 2018 sports events in the United States
2018 in sports in Nevada